Alexander Abercromby of Glassaugh, Fordyce, Banffshire (5 November 1678  – 23 December 1728) was a Scottish Army officer and politician who sat in the Parliament of Scotland from 1706 to 1707 and as a Whig in the  British House of Commons from 1707 to 1727.

In 1699 he inherited Tullibody House east of Stirling from his cousin George Abercromby. He remodeled the house in 1710 and in 1719 additionally acquired the nearby Menstrie Castle. Abercromby was a book collector who had a significant private collection, and books bearing his bookplate can still be found in libraries today. 

Abercromby was the third, but eldest surviving son of Alexander Abercromby and his wife Katherine Dunbar, daughter of Sir Robert Dunbar, of Grangehill, Elgin. By 1703, he married Helen Meldrum, daughter  of George Meldrum of Crombie, Marnoch, Banff, minister of Glass, Banff. From 1706 he was an officer in the 21st Foot, the Royal Scots Fusiliers. He was ADC to the Duke of Marlborough in the Low Countries in 1711, and rose to the rank of lieutenant-colonel, retiring on half-pay in 1721.

Abercromby was Commissioner justiciary for the Highlands in 1701 and 1702. He was returned as Shire Commissioner for Banffshire in the Parliament of Scotland in 1706 and after the Act of Union was one of the Scottish representatives to the first Parliament of Great Britain in 1707. He was returned as Member of Parliament for Banffshire in the British general elections of  1708, 1710, 1713, 1715 and  1722. He did not stand in 1727. He was Lieutenant Governor of Fort William from 1726.

Abercrombie died on 23 December 1728. He and his wife, Helen Meldrum, had two sons and four daughters, including Patrick Abercromby. His daughter Catherine was the great-grandmother of Lord Byron.

References

External links

1678 births
1728 deaths
People from Banffshire
Scottish politicians
Royal Scots Fusiliers officers
Members of the Parliament of Great Britain for Scottish constituencies
British MPs 1707–1708
British MPs 1708–1710
British MPs 1710–1713
British MPs 1713–1715
British MPs 1715–1722
British MPs 1722–1727
Alexander
Members of the Parliament of Scotland 1702–1707